Hedgehog in the Fog is a 1975 Soviet animated film directed by Yuri Norstein and produced by the Soyuzmultfilm studio in Moscow. The Russian script was written by Sergei Grigoryevich Kozlov, who also published a book under the same name.

In 2006, Norstein published a book titled Hedgehog in the Fog, listing himself as an author alongside Kozlov.

Plot 
Hedgehog (voiced by Maria Vinogradova) sets off for his evening visit to his friend Bear-Cub. Every evening, the two meet to have tea and count the stars. This evening, Hedgehog is bringing Bear-Cub some raspberry-jam as a special treat. As Hedgehog heads out, a sinister-looking eagle-owl begins to stalk him.

As he walks through the woods, Hedgehog sees a beautiful white horse. As Hedgehog watches, the horse disappears into the heavy fog. Curious as to whether the horse will drown in the fog, Hedgehog decides to explore the fog for himself. As he travels into a valley, the fog is soon so thick that Hedgehog loses his way.

Believing that he has spotted the white horse, Hedgehog instead discovers a leaf floating down with a snail riding on it. Hedgehog tries to touch the snail, but it floats away and disappears. Another shadowy creature resembling an elephant appears. It is so large and frightening that Hedgehog runs away, only to be startled by a black bat. All the while, the white horse is seen in glimpses.

Finally, Hedgehog spots the largest shape of all. Setting down his jam, he picks up a stick and pokes at the large shape to find that it is a hollow tree. Suddenly, he realizes that he has lost his jam and searches frantically for it, only to find himself surrounded by the owl, the bat, and the shadowy elephant. He becomes more and more confused and frightened until a friendly dog emerges from the fog and returns the jam to Hedgehog.

Hedgehog attempts to find a way out of the fog, but falls into a river. He is resigned to let the river take him where it will, but a mysterious voice asks what is wrong. The voice (implied to belong to a fish) takes Hedgehog to shore, where Hedgehog finds himself back in the woods, free from fog. Hedgehog thanks his rescuer.

Resuming his journey, Hedgehog runs into Bear-Cub (voiced by Vyacheslav Nevinny), who has been searching for his friend. At first, Bear-Cub scolds Hedgehog for being so late that the tea has gone cold and the fire has burned down, but eventually, Bear-Cub admits that he was worried that something ill had become of Hedgehog and that there would be no-one with whom to watch the stars.

The two friends sit by the fire and drink their tea. Bear-Cub talks on and on about how glad he is to have found his friend, but Hedgehog stares in silence at the stars, wondering what became of the white horse.

Creators

Awards 
1976—Frunze All-Union Film Festival: Hedgehog in the Fog "best animated film"
1976—Tehran Children's and Youth Film Festival: Hedgehog in the Fog "best animated film"
2003—Tokyo All time animation best 150 in Japan and Worldwide: Hedgehog in the Fog "№1 Animated film of all the time"

Production 

The fog effects were created by putting a very thin piece of paper on top of the scene and slowly lifting it up toward the camera frame-by-frame until everything behind it became blurry and white.

Role in Soviet animation 
Soviet-era children's animation and literature was faced with the task of producing politically acceptable content. Anthropologist Serguei Oushakine recognizes this atmosphere of indefinite deferment in the animation, stating: "The main thing is the work of imagination, or more precisely, the terror and pleasure with which it is linked. The final scene of pleasure, to which these various phantasmal and/or realistic experiences should indeed have led, is not included in the plot." This is evident through the hedgehog's anxiety and fixation on the horse, even after he succeeds in meeting the bear for tea.

Legacy 
Hedgehog in the Fog was ranked  in a poll at the 2003 Laputa Animation Festival where 140 animators from around the world voted for the best animated films of all time.

Hayao Miyazaki, acclaimed animator of Studio Ghibli stated that he drew his inspiration from many animators including Yuri Norstein.

Since January 2009, the main character (the Hedgehog) from the movie has a statue in the city center of the capital of Ukraine, Kyiv.

The film was spoofed in the third episode of the eighth season of the animated comedy series Family Guy, "Spies Reminiscent of Us", in 2009.

The opening ceremonies for the 2014 Winter Olympics referenced this work, mentioning it in a list of signature Russian accomplishments and artists, including Fyodor Dostoevsky, Leo Tolstoy, and Sputnik.

The series Kikoriki has an episode called Chiko in the Fog, reminiscent of Nornstein's cartoon in its composition and style.

The 16th episode of Pokémon the Series: Sun & Moon – Ultra Legends called "Memories in the Mist!" inspired from this work.

The Cartoon Network Studios' series Summer Camp Island has an episode called "Pepper and the Fog" tributes to this work.

See also 
History of Russian animation
List of stop-motion films
List of films considered the best

References

External links 

 Hedgehog in the Fog at the Animator.ru
 
 
 Hedgehog in the Fog at the Keyframe – the Animation Resource
 Laputa Animation Festival 2003 (in Japanese)
 BBC Article about Soviet brands, including "Ёжик в тумане" in Russian
 Norstein's Studio Official Website

1975 films
1975 animated films
1975 short films
1970s stop-motion animated films
1970s animated short films
Films directed by Yuri Norstein
Cutout animation films
Russian animated short films
Soviet animated films
Soyuzmultfilm
Fictional hedgehogs
Films about hedgehogs
Films set in forests
Films based on Russian folklore